Peter "Peja" Rutger Lindholm (born 2 June 1970 in Östersund, Sweden) is a retired Swedish curler. Lindholm is currently a coach of the Chinese Curling Association. Before Niklas Edin, many regarded him as the best European skip ever.

Over his two-decade curling playing career, Lindholm won three world championships as a skip, winning in 1997, 2001 and 2004, and also being runner up in both 1998 and 2000. He is also a two-time European champion (1998 and 2001) and is a former world junior champion.  He had constant disappointment in his career though at the Olympics, where despite being one of the gold medal favorites in each of 1998, 2002, 2006 his team ended up medalless, coming closest in 2002 with a 4th-place finish.

One thing he was known for was amazing success against and being the career nemesis of Kevin Martin, even running up a streak of 10 consecutive wins at one point which was broken in the semi finals of the 2002 Olympics.  He also had an excellent record vs. the all-time great team of Randy Ferbey (David Nedohin throwing skip stones) in the 2000s.

Lindholm announced his retirement from curling following the 2007 European Curling Championships.

Coaching career
In 2011, Lindholm became the coach of the Swedish men's team skipped by Niklas Edin, coaching them in the World Championships. He also coached the Swedish women's team at the 2010 World Championship. He then became the Swedish national coach in 2015 when Fredrik Lindberg became the team coach.

He was also either the Coach or Captain of Team Europe at the Continental Cup each time it was held from 2008–2015.

Awards
 Colin Campbell Award: 1995
 WJCC Sportsmanship Award: 
 WJCC All-Star skip: , 
 WJCC All-Star second: 
 In 1998 he was inducted into the Swedish Curling Hall of Fame.

See also
 1997 Ford World Curling Championships
 2001 Ford World Curling Championships
 2004 Ford World Curling Championships

References

External links
 

1970 births
Living people
People from Östersund
Swedish male curlers
Curlers at the 2006 Winter Olympics
Lindholm, Peha
Curlers at the 1998 Winter Olympics
World curling champions
European curling champions
Swedish curling champions
Olympic curlers of Sweden
Swedish curling coaches
Continental Cup of Curling participants